Sarfaroshi Ki Tamanna is an Urdu patriotic poem written by Bismil Azimabadi as a dedication to young freedom fighters of the Indian independence movement.

Composition & publication
In 1921 Bismil wrote this poem, following the Jallianwala Bagh massacre and other atrocities by the British colonialists. It was first published in journal "Sabah", published from Delhi. The ghazal has 11 couplets. Khuda Bakhsh Library has preserved the original copy and page of his diary containing this poem written by him and the corrections done by his mentor Shad Azimabadi.

War-cry of independence movement
The poem was immortalised by Ram Prasad Bismil, an Indian freedom fighter, as a war cry during the British Raj period in India.
It has also been associated with the younger generation of inter-war freedom fighters such as Ashfaqullah Khan, Bhagat Singh and Chandrashekhar Azad.

The Ghazal

Transliteration

English translation

Recent use
The first line of the poem was recited by Dr. Manmohan Singh in his Budget Speech of 1992, on the floor of Lok Sabha.
The poem has been recently being in use by various mass movements, like the anti-CAA protests in India, Pakistani Students Solidarity March, etc.

Popular culture 
The poem was used in Manoj Kumar's Shaheed (1965) on the life of Bhagat Singh. It was again used (with altered lines) as the lyrics for songs two films: in the title song of the 1999 film Sarfarosh (Zindagi Maut Na Ban Jaye), and in the 2002 Hindi film, The Legend of Bhagat Singh. The poem has also been used in the 2000 film, Dhadkan and 2006 film, Rang De Basanti. The poem is also referenced in abridged form in the 2009 movie, Gulaal by Anurag Kashyap. The poem has also been recently used in Ajay Devgn's 2021 film Bhuj: The Pride of India.

See also
Kakori conspiracy

References

Further reading 

 Sarfaroshi-ki-tamanna

Indian poems
Urdu-language poems
Revolutionary movement for Indian independence